Meet the Feebles (also known as Frogs of War in New Zealand as the film's English fake working title) is a 1989 New Zealand puppet musical black comedy film directed by Peter Jackson, and written by Jackson, Fran Walsh, Stephen Sinclair and Danny Mulheron (who also performed the body of lead character Heidi the Hippo). It features Jim Henson-esque puppets in a perverse comic satire.
Like Henson's Muppets, the Feebles are animal-figured puppets (plus some suited performers) who are members of a stage troupe. However, whereas the Muppets characterize positivity, naïve folly, and innocence, the Feebles largely present negativity, vice, and other misanthropic characteristics. It is the first Jackson film that was co-written by his future partner Fran Walsh, who has gone on to act as co-writer for all his subsequent films.

Plot

The eponymous Feeble Variety Hour theatre troupe is rehearsing the title song with hopes of finding success through being picked up for a syndicated television show. Heidi (a hippopotamus), the star, is insulted by pornographic director Trevor (a rat) and complains to her boss and lover, Bletch (a walrus), who is actually in an adulterous relationship with Samantha (a Siamese cat). Meanwhile, Robert (a hedgehog), the newest member of the team, arrives at the theatre, where he is accosted by reporter F. W. Fly (a fly), who tries to corrupt Robert into informing on the cast, meets Arthur (a worm), the show's manager, and immediately falls in love with another newcomer, Lucille (a poodle). Trevor is approached by sniveling drug-addicted knife thrower Wynyard (a frog) looking for his fix, but the drugs have not yet been delivered. Guppy (a fish) auditions for The Feebles backstage, only to get eaten by Bletch. After Heidi finishes jogging, Samantha confronts her, insults her, and reveals her relationship with Bletch, resulting in a fight between the two, in which Heidi throws her in a cardboard box. With the help of Arthur, Robert is able to serenade Lucille, confessing his love to her, and the two become engaged. 

After his tribble-like creatures accidentally get crushed by a barrel, animal tamer Sid (an elephant), and Arthur have a beer, when he receives a visit from his ex-girlfriend, showgirl Sandy (a chicken) with his alleged son Seymour the Elechicken (an improbable-looking elephant/chicken hybrid). Sandy informs him she will be preparing a paternity case against him. Bletch and Barry (a bulldog) consummate a drug deal with Cedric (a warthog), during which Bletch and Cedric deliberately sabotage each other during a game of golf, which ends with Bletch winning by throwing up the chewed remains of Guppy. 

Back at the theater, Dennis (an aardvark) is shown peeping on the second most important star of the show, Harry (a rabbit) in a threesome with two female rabbits. Trevor is shooting a porn film in the basement with the Masked Masochist (a weta) and Madam Bovine (a cow). They are interrupted by Robert, who mistakes the scene for torture and tries to save Bovine, who in turn accidentally crushes the Masked Masochist, suffocating him. Trevor later feeds him to a fish-like monster.

The director of the show, Sebastian (a red fox), lambasts Robert for failing his part as an extra on the stage. As punishment, he assigns Robert the task of replacing Wynyard's assistant, who has just been killed by Wynyard's knife throwing while going through drug withdrawal. At the toilet, Harry is suffering from a mystery illness and F. W. Fly harasses him. Wynyard tells Robert his story of Vietnam, and convinces Robert to give him $50 to buy drugs from Trevor. After seeing Trevor's latest porno film starring Dennis (who Trevor chose for a substitute) and Madame Bovine, Bletch decides they need a new porn star, and Trevor chooses Lucille. Harry passes out down some stairs, much to the surprise of fellow cast member Dorothy (a sheep), who yells for help. Dr. Quack (a duck) gives Harry only twelve hours to live, both unaware of F.W. Fly spying on them from the ceiling above. 

Elsewhere, Abi (a human), the show's contortionist, accidentally manages to roll himself into a ball during rehearsal. Hating how the show is turning out, Sebastian demands for his song to be included, only to be turned down and thrown out by Bletch.

F. W. Fly continually harasses Harry, ultimately reporting his illness to the tabloids. Trevor drugs Lucille and tries to rape her as an audition, but is caught by Robert. When he walks in on the scene, Robert thinks that Lucille was drinking and throwing herself at Trevor, and disowns her. After an awful rehearsal, Sebastian lambasts Heidi, causing her to rush to Bletch for emotional affirmation, but walks in on Samantha performing oral sex on him. That night, after testing the drugs provided by Cedric on Dennis, the drugs turn out to be borax, infuriating Bletch. Cedric's agent Louie (a dog) is literally liquefied after being force-fed some of the borax by Bletch's henchmen. 

Heidi locks herself in her room, throws a tantrum, and refuses to perform, but relents after Bletch has make-up sex with her. Soon after, Bletch and his cronies venture to the docklands to fight Cedric and his crab-crewmen. Bletch's side prevails after killing Cedric and the crabs, as well as a giant spider, which bites off Barry's head, and Cedric's boss, Mr. Big (a sperm whale), by driving through his digestive system and coming out his anus. After seeing the article of Harry's illness in the newspaper, The Speculator, Bletch decides to retaliate, presumably wanting to avoid negative press on the cast. Lucille tries to convince Robert of her love for him, but he tells her he never wants to see her again. Trevor lures F. W. Fly into the bathroom, where Bletch tears his wings off and flushes him down the toilet. Shortly afterwards, Heidi attempts to seduce Bletch in his office, but Bletch confesses to Heidi that he actually hates her and wants to give the main role to Samantha. This causes Heidi to mentally break down, and envisions the rest of the Feebles laughing at her.

Later, things begin to go awry during the performance. An ailing Harry winds up vomiting all over the stage during his performance, Sid is accosted by Sandy in the midst of his act, which causes it to fall apart, Wynyard accidentally kills himself during his act when he loses his grip on one of his knives and it comes down on his head, and Sebastian decides to take matters into his own hands. After a failed attempt at hanging herself, Heidi then tries to commit suicide with an M60 machine gun, but at that second, Samantha walks into the room and taunts Heidi upon seeing her about to end her life. Heidi snaps, turns the gun on Samantha, and shoots her dead. Sebastian, in a poor and desperate attempt to save the show, puts on a musical number about the act of "Sodomy", disgusting the silent and unamused live audience, much to the horror of Bletch, who orders Trevor to kill him. As he does so, Heidi then goes on a shooting spree, killing many of the cast, including Harry (who was told by Dr. Quack that he was going to recover as he only has "bunny pox"), Abi (who finally managed to free his head only to be crushed by his bedded nails), Dorothy (who attempted to talk to Heidi), and others.

At the end of the show, Heidi continues her shooting spree, and Sid braves the crazed Heidi's automatic fire to save his son, after Sandy gets her head shot off. Sebastian hides in Harry’s giant carrot-rocket, and is injured when Heidi causes it to go off and crash into a wall. Robert rescues Lucille from being shot and professes that he still loves her, and Lucille tells him the truth about Trevor's attempted raping of her. Bletch attempts to talk Heidi into surrendering, but Heidi opens fire on him and he drops from the balcony. Lying injured on the stage, Bletch convinces Heidi to stop her rampage by proclaiming he still loves her, only for Trevor to shoot her in the shoulder from behind with a shotgun.

Bletch, having tricked Heidi into letting her guard down, orders Trevor to kill her, only for Robert to intervene by swinging on a rope from the rafters and colliding with Trevor, incapacitating Trevor briefly enough for Heidi to reclaim the machine gun and shoot him dead. Bletch lunges at Heidi in a last ditch effort, but is killed too. From backstage, Arthur tells Heidi that he regrettably had to tip off the police about Heidi's shooting rampage. Heidi accepts this and makes one last request before her impending incarceration - to play her musical number, "Garden of Love", to which Arthur complies.

The epilogue reveals the fates of only seven survivors: Sid gets extensive repair on his kneecaps after being accidentally shot by Heidi in her rampage and works in an orchard as a struggling horticulturist with his son Seymour. Arthur received an OBE for his lifelong service at the theater and retires to the country. Sebastian recovers from his injuries and became a successful writer who achieved worldwide fame for his best seller, The Feeble Variety Massacre: One Man's Act of Heroism!, and is currently negotiating film rights. Robert (now an award-winning fashion photographer for a women's magazine) and Lucille are married with two children. Finally, Heidi, whose killing spree resulted in her imprisonment in a women's penitentiary for ten years, has been rehabilitated into the community and now works under a new identity on the check-out counter of a large supermarket.

Cast
 Mark Hadlow as:
 Robert the Hedgehog
 Heidi the Hippo (voice)
 Barry the Bulldog
 Chorus Girl #3
 Peter Vere-Jones as:
 Bletch the Walrus
 Arthur the Worm
 The Baker
 Newspaper Mouse (Paperboy)
 The Announcer
 Donna Akersten as:
 Lucille the Poodle
 Samantha the Cat
 Dorothy the Sheep
 Female Rabbit #1
 Chorus Girl #2
 Fitness Tape Voice
 Stuart Devenie as:
 Sebastian the Fox
 Dr. Quack the Duck (doing a Paul Lynde impression)
 Daisy the Cow (Madame Bovine)
 Sandy the Chicken
 Cedric the Warthog
 Seymour the Elechicken (mixed elephant and chicken)
 Female Rabbit #2
 Chorus Girl #1
 Brian Sergent as:
 Wynyard the Frog (doing a Jim Ignatowski impression)
 Trevor the Rat (doing a Peter Lorre impression)
 F. W. Fly
 Jim the Frog
 Chuck the Frog
 The Spider
 Vietnamese Gophers
 Ross Jolly as:
 Harry the Rabbit (doing a Mel Blanc impression)
 Dennis the Aardvark
 Abi the Contortionist
 Mr. Big the Whale
 Pekingese
 Vietnamese Gophers
 Mark Wright as:
 Sid the Elephant
 The Masked Masochist
 Louie the Dog
 Guppy the Fish
 Poodle
 Snake bartender
 Crab
 Chorus Girl #4
 Fane Flaws as Musician Frog
 Danny Mulheron as Heidi the Hippo (body)

Puppeteers
 Jonathon Acorn - supervising puppeteer
 Ramon Aguilar - supervising puppeteer
 Eleanor Aitken
 Terri Anderton
 Sean Ashton-Peach
 Carl Buckley
 Sarah Glensor
 Danny Mulheron
 George Port
 Ian Williamson
 Justine Wright

Production
The film was originally conceived as part of a television series, and only belatedly became a feature after Japanese investors proposed expanding it; as such, the script was hastily re-written. The dialogue was recorded before shooting began. Made on an extremely low budget considering the time-consuming process of working with puppets, the film went over budget and schedule. Some scenes, including the Vietnam flashback, were funded by members of the film crew, and filmed secretly under the title Frogs of War. The Vietnam flashback includes a game of Russian roulette as a parody of The Deer Hunter. An initial application for Film Commission money was rejected by executive director Jim Booth, who a short time later became Jackson's producer. The Commission eventually granted the production two-thirds of its $750,000 budget, though relationships between the funders and the production soured and the Film Commission removed its credit from the film. It is often mistakenly stated that there are no human characters in the film; the character Abi is a human. However, there are no real-life human characters in the film. Director Jackson has a cameo as an audience member dressed as an alien from Bad Taste. Every vehicle seen in the film is a variation on the Morris Minor, including a specially constructed limousine. Morris Minors also appear in Jackson's Bad Taste and Braindead. By presumed coincidence, one of the characters, Harry the Hare, shares a name with the title character of James B. Hemesath's short story "Harry the Hare" (himself a Bugs Bunny pastiche), written for Harlan Ellison's anthology Again, Dangerous Visions in 1972.

Soundtrack

The film's music was composed by Peter Dasent. The soundtrack was released in 1991 by Q.D.K. Media.

Track listing

Release
The film was marketed in some countries with the tagline: "From the director of Bad Taste, comes a movie with no taste at all!"

Meet the Feebles was given its public premiere at a fantasy film festival in Hamburg, in April 1990.

From then on, the film was released theatrically in Japan (7 December 1990); Portugal (February 1991); Australia (March 1991); Sweden (April 1991); Germany (May 1991); France (July 1991); United Kingdom (April 1992); and the United States (February 1995 in New York and September 1995 nationwide).

The film was banned in Ireland.

Reception
On Rotten Tomatoes the film has an approval rating of 71% based on reviews from 24 critics, with an average rating of 6.5/10. The site's consensus reads "Dark and vulgar, Meet the Feebles is a backstage comedy featuring puppets that offers proof of Peter Jackson's taste for sheer outrageousness, even if it often lapses into pure juvenilia."

During a limited theatrical release in North America in 2002, critic James Berardinelli touched on aspects of the film which likely helped ensure it limited release in cinemas. "The stories of these ... characters are told in a disgustingly graphic, obscenely offbeat, and caustically funny manner. Meet the Feebles is for those with a strong stomach and a seriously warped sense of humor. The film is so off the beaten track that it makes Monty Python seem mainstream." Janet Maslin of the New York Times gave it 2 out of 5 and wrote that it was  "Destined to stand as an unfortunate footnote to Mr. Jackson's career."

Legacy
Despite being a commercial failure on release (grossing only 80,000), the film went on to win critical praise and a cult following plus won over new viewers following Jackson's success with The Lord of the Rings trilogy. During his acceptance speech at the 2004 Academy Awards, Jackson mentioned Meet the Feebles (along with Bad Taste), joking that it had been "wisely overlooked by the Academy." The film is mentioned by American singer-songwriter Jeffrey Lewis in his song 'Cult Boyfriend.

See also
 New Zealand humour
 Adult puppeteering
 Avenue Q, an adult-themed musical play featuring human and puppet actors.
 The Happytime Murders
 The Deer Hunter
 The Exorcist
 Midnight movie

References

External links

 
 Trailer on YouTube

1989 films
1989 comedy films
1980s black comedy films
1980s comedy horror films
1980s crime comedy films
1980s exploitation films
1980s musical comedy films
1980s satirical films
1980s English-language films
New Zealand black comedy films
New Zealand comedy horror films
New Zealand crime comedy films
New Zealand musical comedy films
New Zealand satirical films
New Zealand splatter films
Puppet films
Muppet parodies
Films about dogs
Films about elephants
Films about flies
Films about foxes
Films about frogs
Films about hedgehogs
Fictional hippopotamuses
Films about mice and rats
Films about pinnipeds
Films about rabbits and hares
Films about worms
Anthropomorphic animals
Films about death
Films set in a theatre
Films set in New Zealand
Films shot in New Zealand
Films set in 1989
Films directed by Peter Jackson
Films with screenplays by Peter Jackson
Films with screenplays by Fran Walsh
Films with screenplays by Stephen Sinclair
WingNut Films films
1980s New Zealand films